Thomas Gallo may refer to:

Thomas Gallo (politician) (1914–1994), American politician
Thomas Gallo (rugby union) (born 1999), Argentine-born Italian rugby union player